A county registrar is an official attached to the Irish Circuit Court who carries out a number of quasi-judicial and administrative functions regarding the functioning of the court within their assigned  county or counties.

The county registrar has responsibility for the administration and management of the circuit court offices in each county. These quasi-judicial functions of a county registrar in the Circuit Court are similar to those of the Master of the High Court in the High Court.

Other roles
Except in Dublin and Cork, the county registrar is also the sheriff and responsible for the enforcement of court orders and acts as returning officer for all referendums and elections.

Appointment
County registrars are appointed by the government on the nomination of the Appointments Advisory Board.

References

External links
Role of County Registrar
Circuit Court - Website of the Citizens' Information Board
Court offices - Website of the Citizens' Information Board
Courts of Justice Act, 1936
Courts (Supplemental Provisions) Act, 1961
Courts and Court Officers Act, 1995
Website of the Judicial Appointments Advisory Board
 Court Offices by Jurisdiction

Law of the Republic of Ireland
Courts of the Republic of Ireland